Joann Ariola (born June 14, 1958) is a councilwoman of the New York City Council, representing District 32 which includes Woodhaven, Richmond Hill, Ozone Park, Howard Beach, Broad Channel, and the western half of the Rockaway Peninsula.  She previously served as the chairwoman of the Queens Republican Party.

Ariola is a lifelong resident of the 32nd Council District. She was born in Ozone Park and raised in Howard Beach. She attended P.S. 63 (Old South), P.S. 207 (Rockwood Park), Our Lady of Grace Catholic School, Stella Maris High School on the Rockaway Peninsula and Adelphi Business School.

An Italian-American resident of Howard Beach, Ariola is a close ally of former Councilman Eric Ulrich, Bob Holden and former Democratic Assembly Member Phil Goldfeder.  Ariola was elected to the NYC City Council in 2021 over Democrat Felicia Singh.  Despite many predicting a close race, she handily defeated Singh 67%-32%.

Election history

References

New York City Council members
American people of Italian descent
1958 births
Living people
Women New York City Council members
New York (state) Republicans